"Demons" was the fourth single taken from Irish singer Brian McFadden's debut solo album, Irish Son (2004). The song failed to match the success of his previous solo releases, and was unable to reach the top ten on the UK Singles Chart. The song peaked at number 24 on the Irish Singles Chart and number 28 on the UK Singles Chart, becoming McFadden's worst performing single. This resulted in his record deal being cut and McFadden parting with his record label. The music video for the song was directed by Howard Greenhalgh.

Track listings
UK CD1
 "Demons" (radio edit) – 3:36 (Brian McFadden, Guy Chambers)
 "Hole in the Sky" – 3:32 (Brian McFadden, Guy Chambers)

UK CD2
 "Demons" (album version) – 3:57 (Brian McFadden, Guy Chambers)
 "Auf Wiedersehen Bitch" – 4:08 (Brian McFadden, Guy Chambers)
 "Demons" (live at the Belfast Empire, 27 November 2004) – 4:04 (Brian McFadden, Guy Chambers)
 "Be True to Your Woman" (live at the Belfast Empire, 27 November 2004) – 3:57 (Brian McFadden, Guy Chambers)
 "Demons" (video)

References

2004 songs
2005 singles
Brian McFadden songs
Music videos directed by Howard Greenhalgh
Song recordings produced by Mark Taylor (record producer)
Song recordings produced by Guy Chambers
Songs written by Brian McFadden
Songs written by Guy Chambers
Sony Music singles